Vecko-Journalen (Swedish: Weekly Record) was a weekly magazine published under various titles from 1910 to 2002.

History and profile
Vecko-Journalen was founded by Erik Åkerlund in 1910. The same year he also established the publishing company Åhlén & Åkerlunds. The magazine was based in Stockholm and was published on a weekly basis. Among many others, Börge Bengtsson served  as the editor-in-chief of the magazine. It was one of the Swedish publications which featured news materials provided by the Swedish Intelligence Agency during World War II.

It was published weekly from 1910 to 1963 when it merged with the magazine Idun and took the double-barrelled name Idun-Veckojournalen.  The merged magazine continued to be published weekly until 1980, when falling circulation figures forced it to a monthly cycle, and it was renamed Månadsjournalen (Swedish: Monthly Record).  It ceased publication in 2002.

References

External links
WorldCat record

1910 establishments in Sweden
1963 disestablishments in Sweden
Defunct magazines published in Sweden
Magazines established in 1910
Magazines disestablished in 1963
Magazines published in Stockholm
Swedish-language magazines
Weekly magazines published in Sweden